Mary Willa "Mamie" Gummer (born August 3, 1983) is an American actress. She starred in the title role of The CW series Emily Owens, M.D. (2012–2013), and played the recurring role of Nancy Crozier on The Good Wife (2010–2015) and its spin-off, The Good Fight (2018). She has also appeared in the films Evening (2007), Side Effects (2013), Cake (2014), and Ricki and the Flash (2015). Gummer was nominated for the 2016 Drama Desk Award for Outstanding Actress in a Play for the original production of Ugly Lies the Bone. She is a daughter of Don Gummer and Meryl Streep.

Early life and education
Gummer was born in New York City and is the eldest daughter of actress Meryl Streep and sculptor Don Gummer. She grew up in Salisbury, Connecticut, and also spent five years in Los Angeles with her older brother, Henry Wolfe Gummer, and younger sisters, actors Grace Gummer and Louisa Jacobson.

Gummer attended Miss Porter's School, and graduated from the Kent School in Kent, Connecticut, before continuing her studies in theater and communications at Northwestern University, graduating in 2005.

Career
As a toddler, she appeared with her mother in Heartburn (credited under the name Natalie Stern to avoid press scrutiny). Twenty months old at the time of filming, she received a positive review in The New York Times. After graduating from college in 2005, she made her off-Broadway debut alongside Michael C. Hall in the premiere of Noah Haidle's Mr. Marmalade, for which she won a Theatre World Award. In 2007, she received a Lucille Lortel Award nomination for her performance in Theresa Rebeck's The Water's Edge.

Gummer made her motion-picture debut as an adult with a minor role in Lasse Hallström's The Hoax (2006), starring Richard Gere. In 2007, she starred with her mother in Michael Cunningham's film adaptation of Susan Minot's novel Evening, playing her mother as a young woman. The film, directed by Lajos Koltai, featured Vanessa Redgrave, Glenn Close, and Claire Danes.
She portrayed Sally Adams in the 2008 HBO mini series John Adams, which details the life of the second President of the United States. She made her Broadway debut in the Tony Award–nominated revival of Les liaisons dangereuses in 2008, for which she received critical praise. She also guest-starred on the CBS legal drama The Good Wife in the season 1 episode "Bad" portraying Nancy Crozier. Her character returned again on season 2 episodes "Cleaning House" and "Getting Off".

In 2010, she starred in The Lightkeepers with Richard Dreyfuss, Tom Wisdom, Blythe Danner and Bruce Dern.

Starting in 2011, she starred in the ABC medical show Off the Map with Zach Gilford and Valerie Cruz.

In April 2011, she starred with Hamish Linklater and Alison Fraser in the Off-Broadway production of The School For Lies written by David Ives, directed by Walter Bobbie, and produced by Classic Stage Company.

In 2012, she starred in The CW's Emily Owens, M.D. The series was canceled early during its first season, but the network continued to air the rest of its 13-episode order.

Starting in 2015, she began a featured role in the WGN America series Manhattan.

From October to December 2015, she starred in the original production of the play Ugly Lies the Bone for the Roundabout Theater Company, and received a 2016 Drama Desk Award nomination for Outstanding Actress in a Play for her performance.

On February 1, 2016, it was announced that Gummer had joined the cast of the Amazon series The Collection as a series regular in the role of Helen Sabine.

Gummer played Lucy Purcell, a mother of two children who finds herself involved in a crime, in the third season of HBO’s anthology drama True Detective.

Personal life
After a year and a half of dating, Gummer became engaged to actor Benjamin Walker in October 2009. They married in July 2011 at her parents' home in Connecticut, and resided in Park Slope, Brooklyn, New York City. In March 2013, it was announced that Gummer and Walker had amicably separated.

Gummer has been involved with charities such as Women's Refugee Commission and the Nomi Network.

She became engaged to writer Mehar Sethi (born Meharban Singh Sethi) in August 2018 and was revealed to be pregnant with her first child in December 2018. They got married in February 2019.  The same month, Gummer gave birth to a son.

Filmography

Awards
 (2006) Theatre World Award
 Winner: Best Supporting Actress for Mr. Marmalade
 (2007) Lucille Lortel Award
 Nomination: Outstanding Featured Actress for The Water's Edge
 (2009) Lucille Lortel Award
 Nomination: Outstanding Featured Actress for Uncle Vanya
 (2016) Drama Desk Award
 Nomination: Outstanding Actress in a Play for Ugly Lies The Bone at Roundabout Underground

References

External links

 
 
 
 Backstage.com
 PaperMag
 Broadway.com

1983 births
20th-century American actresses
21st-century American actresses
American film actresses
American stage actresses
American television actresses
Kent School alumni
Living people
Miss Porter's School alumni
Northwestern University School of Communication alumni
Place of birth missing (living people)
Actresses from Connecticut
People from Salisbury, Connecticut
Alumni of the British American Drama Academy
Meryl Streep
Theatre World Award winners
American people of English descent
American people of German descent
American people of Irish descent
American people of Swiss-German descent